Hashem Beg (also Romanized as Hāshem Beg, Hāshem Bak, and Hashem Beygī) is a village in Gol Gol Rural District, in the Central District of Kuhdasht County, Lorestan Province, Iran. At the 2006 census, its population was 1,213, in 225 families.

References 

Towns and villages in Kuhdasht County